Matita
is an experimental proof assistant under development at the Computer Science Department of the University of Bologna. It is a tool aiding the development of formal proofs by man-machine collaboration, providing a programming environment where formal specifications, executable algorithms and automatically verifiable correctness certificates naturally coexist.

Matita is based on a dependent type system known as the Calculus of (Co)Inductive Constructions (a derivative of Calculus of Constructions), and is compatible, to some extent, with Coq.

The word "matita" means "pencil" in Italian (a simple and widespread editing tool). It is a reasonably small and simple application, whose architectural and software complexity is meant to be mastered by students, providing a tool particularly suited for testing innovative ideas and solutions. Matita adopts a tactic-based editing mode; (XML-encoded) proof objects are produced for storage and exchange.

Main features
Existential variables are native in Matita, allowing a simpler management of dependent goals.

Matita implements a bidirectional type inference algorithm exploiting both inferred and expected types.

The power of the type inference system (refiner) is further augmented by a mechanism of
hints
that helps in synthesizing unifiers in particular situations specified by the user.

Matita supports a sophisticated disambiguation strategy 
based on a dialog between the parser and the typechecker.

At the interactive level, the system implements a small step execution of structured tactics
allowing a much better management of the proof development, and naturally leading
to more structured and readable scripts.

Applications
Matita has been employed in CerCo (Certified Complexity): a 
FP7 European Project 
focused on the development of a formally verified, complexity preserving compiler from a large subset of C to the assembler of a MCS-51 microprocessor.

Documentation
The Matita tutorial provides a pragmatic introduction to the main functionalities of the Matita interactive theorem prover, offering a guided tour through a set of non-trivial examples in the field of software specification and verification.

See also
Curry–Howard correspondence
Interactive theorem proving
Intuitionistic type theory
List of proof assistants

References

External links
 The Matita Proof Assistant
 CerCo Project

Proof assistants
Free theorem provers
Dependently typed languages
Educational math software
OCaml software
Free software programmed in OCaml
Functional languages